"Mélodie d'amour" is a 1989 song recorded by French-Brazilian band Kaoma. Written by Loalwa Braz and Jean-Claude Bonaventure, it was released in March 1990 as the third single from their 1989 album Worldbeat, on which it appears as the sixth track. It was a hit in France, earning a Silver disc.

Charts performance
In France, "Mélodie d'amour" debuted at number 47 on the chart edition of 24 March 1990 and remained for two months in the lower quarter of the top 50 chart. It entered the top twenty in its eleventh week, in which it remained for nine weeks, with a peak at number 11 in its 15th week. It eventually had a 25-week chart run, which was long enough to obtain a Silver disc, awarded by the Syndicat National de l'Édition Phonographique. "Mélodie d'amour" also
charted for 14 weeks on the Dutch Single Top 100, starting at number 99 on 17 March 1990 with two weeks at number 15, its highest position, then dropped quickly.

On the Eurochart Hot 100, it debuted at number 99 on 28 April 1990, then fell off the chart the next week, then re-entered at number 85. It peaked at number 43 in its 11th week and remained on the chart for a total of 18 weeks.

Track listings

 7" single - France, Netherlands, Spain
 "Mélodie d'amour" — 4:11
 "Lambamor" — 4:09

 7" single - UK
 "Mélodie d'amour" — 4:11
 "Lambada" (7" version) — 3:24

 12" maxi - France, UK
 "Mélodie d'amour" (remix club) — 6:10 (remixed by Mark Mc Guire)
 "Mélodie d'amour" (remix 45 t) — 3:56 (remixed by Mark Mc Guire)
 "Mélodie d'amour" (instrumental version) — 3:56

 CD single - France
 "Mélodie d'amour" — 4:11
 "Lambamor" — 4:09

 CD single - Promo - Japan
 "Mélodie d'amour" — 4:13
 "Sopenala" — 4:28

 7" single - Promo - Spain
 "Mélodie d'amour" — 4:11

Personnel
 Artwork – The Artifex Studio, Patrice Roger
 Design – Paul Ritter
 Photography – Andre Rau

Charts and sales

Peak positions

Certifications

Release history

References

1990 songs
1990 singles
Kaoma songs